Adam J. Bass is an American Executive, currently the President, Chief Executive Officer, and Chief Operating Officer of Buchalter Law. Bass started with the company in 1993 and has led the company since 2013. He was named one of the "Top 500 Most Infuential People in L.A." by the L.A. Business Journal in 2021. He recently assisted his firm, Buchalter, in opening an office in the Salt Lake City area, now being called, "The Silicon Slopes" in November, Buchalter established the Kaufman Appellate Fellowship Program. This program provides recent law school graduates interested in judicial clerkships or the appellate field with appellate advocacy experience at an early stage in their work lives.

Bass is a graduate of USD School of Law and also received his undergraduate and graduate degrees at USD. He is an arbitrator for the Los Angeles Superior Court and also works in the Dispute Resolution Section of the Bar Association. Bass is currently on the boards of the California Chamber of Commerce and the Los Angeles Center for Law and Justice. He is a member of the USD School of Law Board of Visitors and the board of trustees of the Buckley School. Bass is active in the California Bar’s Real Property Law Section, the L.A. County Bar Association’s Provisional Remedies Section and the California Receivers Forum.

Career
Bass chairs Buchalter's family office and wealth management practice group and co-chairs the social media influencers industry group. His practice includes representation of companies of all sizes and financial institutions in both transactional and litigation matters. Bass handles general business matters for corporate clients, and his experience includes corporate, loan workouts, creditors’ rights, real property, labor relations, public contracting and regulatory compliance. He joined Buchalter in 1993 and has led the firm since 2013.

His prior positions include the office of Vice Chairman of ACC Capital Holdings, of which Ameriquest was a subsidiary.

References

American lawyers
Living people
Year of birth missing (living people)